The Midland Railway was a heritage railroad operating 16 miles of line in Franklin and Douglas counties, Kansas between Ottawa, Kansas and Baldwin City, Kansas.

It was chartered in 1982 to find an abandoned railroad line to operate. Midland purchased the line from Baldwin City to Ottawa, Kansas from the Atchison, Topeka and Santa Fe Railway in 1987, and began running excursion trains on part of the line later that year. Total length of the line is 16 miles (17.7 km).

Midland operated a demonstration historic railroad, and its mission was to "educate the public about the role railroading played, and continues to play, in the commercial, social, and cultural life of America's Heartland." Midland's base of operations is the depot built in 1906 by the Atchison, Topeka and Santa Fe Railway at 1515 High Street in Baldwin City. This building was added to the National Register of Historic Places in 1983. Midland had received two matching federal grants to rebuild track. Private grants have and are being used to rebuild railroad equipment. Starting in 2004, excursion trains are run all the way from Baldwin City to Ottawa.

The regular operating season ran from Memorial Day (last Monday of May) to October 31 (Halloween). Special events and fairs were held at various times through the year. Weekend Boy Scout camps were held in the spring and fall. Midland's Scout program was one of the few in the country to offer the Railroading merit badge.

Surface Transportation Board
A May 31, 2019 decision by the Surface Transportation Board states:

Baldwin City & Southern Railroad
In 2019, the Midland Railway created a wholly-owned, for-profit subsidiary called the Baldwin City & Southern Railroad (BC&SR).  The original plan was for the BC&SR to take over all active railroad operations, while Midland would focus on public education and historic preservation.  In November of 2019 the BC&SR was awarded a $750,000 Kansas Department of Commerce grant to help with operational costs to transition from the all-volunteer model under which Midland operates, to an employee-based model, with a grant requirement to have at least 22 employees. However, the BC&SR service was discontinued in March of 2020 following a rent dispute with the operator of Baldwin City’s historic train depot.

Kansas Belle Dinner Train 
The Kansas Belle Dinner Train, which also operated out of the Baldwin City depot, utilized Midland’s track and locomotives but was separately owned.  That train on March 14, 2020 also suspended services, and had not resumed them by mid-2022.

Stops
 Baldwin City, Kansas
 Nowhere, Kansas (ghost town)
 Norwood, Kansas (ghost town)
 Ottawa, Kansas

See also
 List of heritage railroads in the United States
 List of Kansas railroads

References

External links

  (archived)

Heritage railroads in Kansas
Tourist attractions in Douglas County, Kansas
Tourist attractions in Franklin County, Kansas